It is also known as the "Year of Africa" because of major events—particularly the independence of seventeen African nations—that focused global attention on the continent and intensified feelings of Pan-Africanism.

Events

January

 January 9–11 – Aswan Dam construction begins in Egypt.
 January 10 – British Prime Minister Harold Macmillan makes the "Wind of Change" speech for the first time, to little publicity, in Accra, Gold Coast (modern-day Ghana).
 January 19 – A revised version of the U.S.-Japan Security Treaty, which allows U.S. troops to be based on Japanese soil, is signed in Washington, D.C. by Prime Minister Nobusuke Kishi and President Dwight D. Eisenhower. The new treaty is opposed by the massive Anpo protests in Japan.
 January 21 
 Coalbrook mining disaster: A coal mine collapses at Holly Country, South Africa, killing 435 miners.
 Avianca Flight 671 crashes and burns upon landing at Montego Bay, Jamaica killing 37, the worst air disaster in Jamaica's history and the first for Avianca.
 January 22
 Charles de Gaulle, President of France, dismisses Jacques Massu as commander-in-chief of French troops in Algeria.
 January 24 – A major insurrection occurs in Algiers against French colonial policy.

February

 February 1 – Greensboro sit-ins: In Greensboro, North Carolina, four black students from North Carolina Agricultural and Technical State University begin a sit-in at a segregated Woolworth's lunch counter. Although they are refused service, they are allowed to stay at the counter. The event triggers many similar non-violent protests throughout the Southern United States, and six months later, the original four protesters are served lunch at the same counter.

 February 3 – Prime Minister of the United Kingdom Harold Macmillan makes the Wind of Change speech to the South African Parliament in Cape Town (although he had first made the speech, to little publicity, in Accra, Gold Coast — modern-day Ghana — on January 10).
 February 5 – The first CERN particle accelerator becomes operational in Geneva, Switzerland.
 February 10 – A conference about the proposed independence of the Belgian Congo begins in Brussels, Belgium.
 February 11 – Twelve Indian soldiers die in clashes with Red Chinese troops along their small common border.
 February 13 – Gerboise Bleue: France tests its first atomic bomb, in the Sahara Desert of Algeria.
 February 18 – The 1960 Winter Olympics begin at the Squaw Valley Ski Resort in Placer County, California.
 February 26 – Alitalia Flight 618: An airliner en route to New York crashes into a cemetery at Shannon, Ireland, shortly after takeoff, killing 34 of the 52 persons on board.
 February 29 – The 5.7  Agadir Earthquake shakes coastal Morocco with a maximum perceived intensity of X (Extreme), destroying Agadir and leaving 12,000 dead and another 12,000 injured.

March

 March 5 – Alberto Korda takes his iconic photograph of Che Guevara, Guerrillero Heroico, in Havana.
 March 6
 Vietnam War: The United States announces that 3,500 American soldiers will be sent to Vietnam.
 The Canton of Geneva in Switzerland gives women the right to vote.
 March 17 
 Northwest Orient Airlines Flight 710 crashes near Tell City, Indiana, killing all 63 on board.
 U.S. President Dwight D. Eisenhower approves a covert Central Intelligence Agency plan to train a paramilitary force against Cuba, which would result in the 1961 Bay of Pigs Invasion.
 March 21 – The Sharpeville massacre in South Africa results in more than 69 dead, 300 injured.
 March 22 – Arthur Leonard Schawlow and Charles Hard Townes receive the first patent for a laser, in the United States.
 March 23 – Soviet Premier Nikita Khrushchev meets French President Charles de Gaulle in Paris.
 March 29 – "Tom Pillibi" by Jacqueline Boyer (music by André Popp, text by Pierre Cour) wins the Eurovision Song Contest 1960 for France.

April

 April 1
 Abdul Rahman of Negeri Sembilan, 1st Yang di-Pertuan Agong of Malaysia, dies in office. He is replaced by Hisamuddin Alam Shah ibni Almarhum Sultan Alaeddin Sulaiman Shah, Sultan of Selangor.
 The United States launches the first weather satellite, TIROS-1.
 The 1960 United States Census begins. There are 179,323,175 U.S. residents on this day. All people from Latin America are listed as white, including blacks from the Dominican Republic, European whites from Argentina and Mexicans who resemble Native Americans.
 April 4 – At the 32nd Academy Awards Ceremony, Ben-Hur wins a record number of Oscars, including Best Picture.
 April 9 – Gunman David Pratt shoots South African Prime Minister Hendrik Verwoerd in Johannesburg, wounding him seriously.
 April 12 – Eric Peugeot, the youngest son of the founder of the Peugeot Corporation, is kidnapped in Paris. He is released on April 15, in exchange for $300,000 in ransom.
 April 19 – April Revolution: South Korean students hold a nationwide pro-democracy protest against President Syngman Rhee, eventually leading him to resign from office.
 April 21 – In Brazil, the country's capital (Federal District) is relocated from the city of Rio de Janeiro to the new city, Brasília, in the highlands. The actual city of Rio de Janeiro becomes the State of Guanabara.
 April 27 – Togo gains independence from France, with the French-administered United Nations Trust Territory being terminated.

May

 May 1
 The U-2 incident: Several Soviet surface-to-air missiles shoot down an American Lockheed U-2 spy plane. Its pilot, Francis Gary Powers of the Central Intelligence Agency, is captured.
 In India, this day is declared as 'Maharashtra Divas', i.e., Maharashtra Day (also celebrated as 'Kaamgaar Divas', i.e., Workers Day).
 May 3 – The European Free Trade Association (EFTA) is established.
 May 4 – West German refugee minister Theodor Oberländer is dismissed because of his Nazi past.
 May 6 – United States President Dwight D. Eisenhower signs the Civil Rights Act of 1960 into law..
 May 10 – The U.S. nuclear-powered submarine , under the command of Captain Edward L. Beach Jr., completes the first underwater circumnavigation of the Earth (codenamed Operation Sandblast).
 May 11 – In Buenos Aires, four Mossad agents abduct fugitive Nazi war criminal Adolf Eichmann in order that he can be taken to Israel and put on trial (Eichmann is later convicted and executed).
 May 13 – A joint Swiss and Austrian expedition makes the first ascent of the Asian mountain Dhaulagiri, the world's 7th highest mountain.
 May 14 – The Kenyan African National Congress Party is founded in Kenya, when 3 political parties join forces.
 May 15 – The satellite Sputnik 4 is launched into orbit by the Soviet Union.
 May 16
 Soviet Premier Nikita Khrushchev demands an apology from President Dwight D. Eisenhower for the U-2 reconnaissance plane flights over the Soviet Union, thus aborting the summit meeting scheduled for Paris in 1960.
 Theodore Maiman operates the first laser.
 May 18 – Real Madrid beats Eintracht Frankfurt 7–3 at Hampden Park, Glasgow, and wins the 1959–60 European Cup in Association football.
 May 22 – The 9.4–9.6  Valdivia earthquake affects Chile with a maximum Mercalli intensity of XII (Extreme). This megathrust earthquake ruptures from Arauco to Chiloé Archipelago, causing the most powerful earthquake on record and a destructive basin-wide tsunami.
 May 23 – Prime Minister of Israel David Ben-Gurion announces that Nazi war criminal Adolf Eichmann has been captured.
 May 27 – In Turkey, a bloodless military coup d'état removes President Celâl Bayar, and installs General Cemal Gürsel as the head of state.
 May 30 – Cemal Gürsel forms the new government of Turkey (its 24th government, composed mostly of so-called "technocrats").

June

 June 1 – New Zealand's first television station begins broadcasting, in the city of Auckland.
 June 5 – The Lake Bodom murders occur in Finland.
 June 9 – 1960 Pacific typhoon season: Typhoon Mary kills 1,600 people in China.
 June 10 – The "Hagerty Incident" – As part of the ongoing Anpo protests in Japan against the U.S.-Japan Security Treaty, a car carrying Dwight D. Eisenhower's press secretary James Hagerty and U.S. Ambassador to Japan Douglas MacArthur II is mobbed by protesters outside of Tokyo's Haneda Airport, requiring the occupants to be rescued by a U.S. Marine helicopter.
 June 15
 The "June 15 Incident" – As part of the massive Anpo protests against the U.S.-Japan Security Treaty in Japan, radical student activists from the Zengakuren student federation attempt to storm the National Diet compound, precipitating a battle with police in which female Tokyo University student Michiko Kanba is killed.
 The BC Ferries company, later to become the second-largest ferry operator in the world, commences service between Tsawwassen and Swartz Bay, British Columbia, Canada.
 June 19 – The new U.S.-Japan Security Treaty is automatically ratified 30 days after passing the Lower House of the Diet.
 June 20 – The short-lived Mali Federation, consisting of the Sudanese Republic (modern-day Republic of Mali) and Senegal, gains independence from France.
 June 22 – 1960 Quebec general election: the ruling Union nationale, led by Antonio Barrette, is defeated by the Quebec Liberal Party, led by Jean Lesage, beginning the 'Quiet Revolution' in the historically conservative Canadian province.
 June 23 – Japanese prime minister Nobusuke Kishi announces his resignation.
 June 24
Joseph Kasa-Vubu is elected as the first President of the independent Democratic Republic of the Congo.
Assassination attempt of Venezuelan President Rómulo Betancourt.
 June 26
 The State of Somaliland (the former British Somaliland protectorate) receives its independence from the United Kingdom. Five days later, it unites as scheduled with the Trust Territory of Somalia (the former Italian Somaliland), to form the Somali Republic.
 The Malagasy Republic (Madagascar) becomes independent from France.
 June 28 – King Bhumibol Adulyadej of Thailand arrives in Washington, D.C. for a 4-day royal visit to the U.S.
 June 30 
 The Belgian Congo receives its independence from Belgium, as the Republic of the Congo (Léopoldville). A civil war follows shortly.
 Public demonstrations by democratic and left forces against Italian government support of the post-fascist Italian Social Movement, are heavily suppressed by police.

July

 July 1
 Ghana becomes a republic, and Kwame Nkrumah becomes its first President.
 Cold War: A Soviet Air Force MiG-19 fighter plane flying north of Murmansk, Russia, over the Barents Sea, shoots down a six-man RB-47 Stratojet reconnaissance plane of the U.S. Air Force. Four of the U.S. Air Force officers are killed, and the two survivors are held prisoner in the Soviet Union.
 The Trust Territory of Somaliland (the former Italian Somaliland) gains its independence from Italy. Concurrently, it unites as scheduled with the five-day-old State of Somaliland (the former British Somaliland) to form the Somali Republic.
 July 4 – Following the admission of the State of Hawaii as the 50th state in August 1959, the new (and current) 50-star Flag of the United States is first officially flown over Philadelphia.
 July 10 – The Soviet Union national football team defeats the Yugoslavian national football team 2–1 in Paris, to win the first UEFA European Championship.
 July 11 – Congo Crisis: Moise Tshombe declares the Congolese province of Katanga independent. He requests and receives help from Belgium.
 July 12 – Chin Peng is exiled from Malaysia to Thailand, and the Malayan state of emergency is lifted.
 July 14 – The United Nations Security Council decides to send troops to Katanga, to oversee the withdrawal of Belgian troops.
 July 20 – Ceylon elects Mrs. Sirimavo Bandaranaike as its Prime Minister, the world's first elected female head of government (she takes office the following day).
 July 25 – The Woolworth Company's lunch counter in Greensboro, North Carolina, the location of a sit-in that has sparked demonstrations by Negroes across the Southern United States, serves a meal to its first black customer.
 July 25–28 – In Chicago, the 1960 Republican National Convention nominates Vice President Richard Nixon as its candidate for President of the United States, and Henry Cabot Lodge Jr., as its candidate to become the new vice-president.

August

 August 1 – Dahomey (modern-day Benin) becomes independent from France.
 August 3 – Niger becomes independent from France.
 August 5 – Upper Volta (modern-day Burkina Faso) becomes independent from France.
 August 6 – In the Republic of the Congo (Léopoldville) (later the Democratic Republic of the Congo), Albert Kalonji declares the independence of the Autonomous State of South Kasai.
 August 7
 The Ivory Coast becomes independent from France.
 The world's first standard gauge passenger preserved railway, the Bluebell Railway, opens to the public in southern England.
 August 9 – The government of Laos is overthrown in a coup.
 August 11 – Chad becomes independent from France.
 August 13 – Ubangi-Shari becomes independent from France, as the Central African Republic. It later becomes the Central African Empire.
 August 15 – Middle Congo becomes independent from France, as the Republic of Congo (Congo-Brazzaville).
 August 16
 The Mediterranean island of Cyprus receives its independence from the United Kingdom.
Kittinger sets world records for: high-altitude jump; free-fall by falling 16.0 miles (25.7 kilometers) before opening his parachute; first space dive, and fastest speed attained by a human being without mechanical or chemical assistance, about 982 k.p.h (614 m.p.h.). Kittinger survives more or less uninjured. He is also the first man to make a solo crossing of the Atlantic Ocean in a gas balloon, and the first man fully to witness the spherical curvature of the Earth. (Felix Baumgartner breaks his space diving record in 2012.)
 August 17
 The newly named Beatles begin a 48-night residency at the Indra Club in Hamburg, West Germany.
 Gabon becomes independent from France.
 The trial of American U-2 pilot Francis Gary Powers begins in Moscow.
 August 19
 Cold War: Moscow, American U-2 pilot Francis Gary Powers is sentenced to 10 years in prison for espionage.
 Sputnik program: The Soviet Union launches the satellite Sputnik 5, with the dogs Belka and Strelka (the Russian for "Squirrel" and "Little Arrow"), 40 mice, two rats and a variety of plants. This satellite returns to Earth the next day and all animals are recovered safely.
 August 20 – Senegal breaks away from the Mali Federation, declaring its independence.
 August 25 – The 1960 Summer Olympic Games begin in Rome.
 August 29 – Hurricane Donna kills 50 people in Florida and New England.

September

 September 1
 Sultan Hisamuddin Alam Shah, Sultan of Selangor and 2nd Yang di-Pertuan Agong of Malaysia, dies in office. He is replaced by Tuanku Syed Putra, Raja of Perlis.
 Disgruntled railroad workers effectively halt operations of the Pennsylvania Railroad in the United States, marking the first shutdown in the company's history (the event lasts two days).
 September 2 – The first elections of the Parliament of the Central Tibetan Administration (in exile in India) are held. The Tibetan community observes this date as Democracy Day.
 September 5
 1960 Summer Olympic Games: Muhammad Ali (at this time Cassius Clay) of the United States wins the gold medal in light-heavyweight boxing.
 Congolese President Joseph Kasa-Vubu dismisses Patrice Lumumba's entire government, and also places Lumumba under house arrest.
 Poet Léopold Sédar Senghor is the first elected President of Senegal.
 September 6 – William Hamilton Martin and Bernon F. Mitchell, two American cryptologists, announce their defection to the Soviet Union at a press conference in Moscow.
 September 8 – In Huntsville, Alabama, U.S. President Dwight D. Eisenhower formally dedicates the Marshall Space Flight Center (which had been activated by NASA on July 1).
 September 9 – The first regular season game in the American Football League (established as a rival league to the NFL) takes place at Boston's Nickerson Field. The Denver Broncos defeated the Boston Patriots, 13–10.
 September 10 – 1960 Summer Olympic Games: Abebe Bikila of Ethiopia wins the gold medal in the marathon, running barefoot in a world time, and becoming the first person from Sub-Saharan Africa to win Olympic gold.
 September 14
 Colonel Joseph Mobutu takes power in Republic of the Congo via a military coup.
 The Organization of Petroleum Exporting Countries (OPEC) is founded by Iran, Iraq, Kuwait, Saudi Arabia, and Venezuela.
 September 21 — Mexican President Adolfo López Mateos nationalizes the country's electrical system.
 September 22 – Mali, the sole remaining member of the "Mali Federation" (following the withdrawal of Senegal one month earlier), declares its full independence as the Republic of Mali.

October

 October 1
 Nigeria becomes independent from the United Kingdom, and Nnamdi Azikiwe becomes its first native-born Governor General.
 Cameroon declares independence from the United Kingdom.
 October 3 – Jânio Quadros is elected President of Brazil, for a five-year term.
 October 7 – Nigeria becomes the 99th member of the United Nations.
 October 12 – Cold War: Soviet Premier Nikita Khrushchev pounds his shoe on a table at a meeting of the United Nations General Assembly, his way of protesting the discussion of the Soviet Union's policies toward Eastern Europe.
 October 14
 Presidential candidate John F. Kennedy first suggests the idea for the Peace Corps of the United States.
 The Premier of New South Wales officially opens Warragamba Dam, one of the world's largest domestic water supply dams.
 October 24 – Nedelin catastrophe: A large rocket explodes on the launch pad at the Baikonur Cosmodrome, killing at least 92 people of the Soviet space program.

November

 November 8 – 1960 United States presidential election: In a close race, Democratic U. S. Senator John F. Kennedy is elected over Republican U. S. Vice President Richard Nixon, to become (at 43) the second youngest man to serve as President of the United States, and the youngest man elected to this position.
 November 14
 Belgium threatens to leave the United Nations, over criticism of its policy concerning the Republic of the Congo.
 Stéblová train disaster: A head-on collision between two trains in Pardubice, Czechoslovakia, kills 118 people.
 November 22 – The United Nations supports the government of Joseph Kasavubu and Joseph Mobutu, in the Republic of the Congo.
 November 26 – 1960 New Zealand general election: The National Party defeats the governing Labour Party after only three years in office. National leader Keith Holyoake becomes Prime Minister of New Zealand for a second time.
 November 28 – Mauritania becomes independent of France.

December

 December – The African and Malagasy Organisation for Economic Cooperation (OAMCE – Organisation Africain et Malagache de Coopération Économique) is established.
 December 1
 Patrice Lumumba, deposed premier of the Republic of the Congo, is arrested by the troops of Colonel Joseph Mobutu.
 A Soviet satellite containing live animals (dogs Pcholka and Mushka) and plants is launched into orbit. Due to a malfunction, it burns up during re-entry.
Striking coal miners at the Miike Coal Mine in Japan return to work, ending the unprecedented 312-day-long Miike Struggle.
 December 2 – U.S. President Dwight D. Eisenhower authorizes the use of $1.0 million for the relief and resettlement of Cuban refugees, who had been arriving in Florida at the rate of about 1,000 per week.
 December 4 – The admission of Mauritania to the United Nations is vetoed by the Soviet Union.
 December 7 – The United Nations Security Council is called into session by the Soviet Union, in order to consider Soviet demands for the Security Council to seek the immediate release of former Congolese Premier Patrice Lumumba.
 December 8 – For the first time, Mary Martin's Peter Pan is presented as a stand-alone 2-hour special on NBC television in the United States, instead of as part of an anthology series. This version, rather than being presented live, is shown on videotape, enabling NBC to repeat it as often as they wish without having to restage it. Although nearly all of the adult actors repeat their original Broadway roles, all of the original children have, ironically, outgrown their roles and are replaced by new actors.
 December 9 – French President Charles de Gaulle's visit to Algeria is bloodied by European and Muslim rioters, in Algeria's largest cities. These riots cause 127 deaths.
 December 13
 1960 Ethiopian coup attempt: While Emperor Haile Selassie of Ethiopia visits Brazil, his Kebur Zabagna (Imperial Bodyguard) leads a military coup against his rule, proclaiming that the emperor's son, Crown Prince Asfaw Wossen Taffari, is the new emperor.
 The countries of El Salvador, Guatemala, Honduras, and Nicaragua announce the formation of the Central American Common Market.
 December 14
 Antoine Gizenga proclaims in the Democratic Republic of the Congo that he has taken over as the country's premier.
 The first tied test is held by the West Indian cricket team in Australia in Brisbane.
 December 15
 King Mahendra of Nepal deposes the democratic government in his country, and takes direct control himself.
 King Baudouin of Belgium marries Doña Fabiola de Mora y Aragón.
 December 16
 Secretary of State Christian Herter announces that the United States will commit five nuclear submarines and eighty Polaris missiles to the defense of the NATO countries by the end of 1963.
 New York mid-air collision: A United Airlines DC-8 collides in mid-air with a TWA Lockheed Constellation over Staten Island in New York City. All 128 passengers and crewmembers on the two airliners, and six people on the ground, are killed.
 December 17 – Troops loyal to Emperor Haile Selassie in Ethiopia overcome the coup that began on December 13, returning the reins to the Emperor upon his return from a trip to Brazil. The Emperor absolves his own son of any guilt.
 December 19 – Fire sweeps through the USS Constellation, to become the U.S. Navy's largest aircraft carrier, while she is under construction at the Brooklyn Navy Yard; killing 50 workers and injuring 150.
 December 23 – Hilkka Saarinen née Pylkkänen was murdered in the so-called the "oven homicide" case in Krootila, Kokemäki, Finland.

World population
 World population: 3,021,475,000
 Africa: 277,398,000
 Asia: 1,701,336,000
 Europe: 604,401,000
 Latin America: 218,300,000
 North America: 204,152,000
 Oceania: 15,888,000

Births

January

 
 January 2 – Naoki Urasawa, Japanese manga author and artist
 January 4
 Michael Stipe, American rock singer (R.E.M.)
 April Winchell, American writer and voice actress
 January 6
 Natalia Bestemianova, Soviet ice dancer, 1988 Olympic Champion
 Kari Jalonen, Finnish ice hockey player
 Nigella Lawson, English journalist, broadcaster, television personality, gourmet and food writer
 Miriam O'Callaghan, Irish media personality
 January 7 – Mohammad Javad Zarif, Iranian politician, diplomat
 January 10
 Jurrie Koolhof, Dutch footballer and manager (d. 2019)
 Negro Casas, Mexican professional wrestler
 Brian Cowen, Taoiseach of Ireland
 January 12
 Oliver Platt, Canadian actor
 Dominique Wilkins, French-born American basketball player
 January 16
 Wan Mohammad Khair-il Anuar, Malaysian politician, architect and entrepreneur (d. 2016) 
 Richard Elliot, Scottish-born American saxophonist
 January 18 – Mark Rylance, English actor, theatre director and playwright
 January 20 
 Sabar Koti, Indian singer (d. 2018)
 Will Wright, American computer game designer
 January 21 – Mamoru Nagano, Japanese designer
 January 22 – Michael Hutchence, Australian rock musician (INXS) (d. 1997)
 January 23 – Patrick de Gayardon, French skydiver and skysurfing pioneer (d. 1998)
 January 27 – Samia Suluhu, President of Tanzania
 January 29
 Gia Carangi, American model (d. 1986)
 Sean Kerly, British field hockey player
 Greg Louganis, American diver
 January 31 – Grant Morrison, Scottish comic book writer and playwright

February

 February 2 – Jari Porttila, Finnish sports journalist
 February 3 – Joachim Löw, German football manager
 February 4 – Jonathan Larson, American composer and playwright (d. 1996)
 February 7
 Yasunori Matsumoto, Japanese voice actor
 James Spader, American actor and producer
 February 8
 Benigno Aquino III, 15th President of the Philippines (d. 2021)
 Alfred Gusenbauer, Chancellor of Austria
 February 9 – Frederik Ndoci, Albanian singer, songwriter, poet, writer, actor and international Recording artist
 February 13 – Pierluigi Collina, Italian football (soccer) referee 
 February 14
 Olivia Cheng, Hong Kong actress
 Meg Tilly, American-Canadian actress and novelist 
 February 16 – Tineke Huizinga, Dutch politician
 February 18
 Gazebo, Italian musician
 Tony Anselmo, American animator and voice actor
 February 19 – Prince Andrew, Duke of York, British prince and second son of Elizabeth II and The Duke of Edinburgh
 February 20
 Kee Marcello, Swedish rock guitarist (Easy Action, Europe)
 Cándido Muatetema Rivas, 4th Prime Minister of Equatorial Guinea (d. 2014)
 February 21
 Laurent Petitguillaume, French radio and television host
 Ricky Tosso, Peruvian actor (d. 2016)
 February 23 – Naruhito, Emperor of Japan
 February 27 
 Andrés Gómez, Ecuadorian tennis player
 Paul Humphreys, English musician (OMD)
 February 28
 Tōru Ōkawa, Japanese voice actor
 Dorothy Stratten, Canadian model and actress (d. 1980)

March

 March 2 – Hector Calma, Filipino basketball player
 March 4
 Mikko Kuustonen, Finnish singer and songwriter
 John Mugabi, Ugandan boxer and World Junior Middleweight champion
 March 7 – Ivan Lendl, Czech tennis player
 March 8
 Finn Carter, American actress
 Jeffrey Eugenides, American author
 March 10 – Anne MacKenzie, Scottish broadcaster
 March 11 – Sharon Jordan, American actress
 March 12 – Minoru Niihara, Japanese singer (Loudness)
 March 13
 Joe Ranft, American screenwriter, animator, storyboard artist and voice actor (d. 2005)
 Adam Clayton, English-born Irish musician (U2)
 March 15 — Rosa Beltrán, Mexican writer, lecturer, and academic.
 March 20 — Norbert Pohlmann, German computer scientist
 March 21 – Ayrton Senna, Brazilian triple Formula One world champion (d. 1994)
 March 23 – Nicol Stephen, Scottish politician
 March 24
 Jan Berglin, Swedish cartoonist
 Kelly Le Brock, American-English model and actress
 Nena, German singer
 March 25 – Brenda Strong, American actress
 March 26 – Jennifer Grey, American actress
 March 27
 Hans Pflügler, German footballer
 Renato Russo, Brazilian singer (Legião Urbana) (d. 1996)
 March 29 – Hiromi Tsuru, Japanese voice actress (d. 2017)

April

 April 1 – Michael Praed, British actor
 April 2 – Linford Christie, British athlete
 April 4 – Hugo Weaving, Nigerian-born Australian actor
 April 8 – John Schneider, American actor
 April 9 – Isabel Coixet, Spanish film director
 April 10
 Fabio Golfetti, Brazilian musician and record producer (Violeta de Outono, Gong)
 Héctor Rivoira, Argentine football manager and player (d. 2019) 
 April 11 – Jeremy Clarkson, English journalist, television show host and comedian
 April 12 – David Thirdkill, American basketball player
 April 13
Dinesh Kaushik, Indian politician
Rudi Völler, German footballer and manager
 April 14 – Brad Garrett, American actor, comedian and voice actor
 April 15 
 Susanne Bier, Danish film director
 King Philippe of Belgium
 April 16
 Wahab Akbar, Filipino politician (d. 2007)
 Rafael Benítez, Spanish football manager
 Pierre Littbarski, German footballer and coach
 April 18
 Neo Rauch, German painter
 J. Christopher Stevens, American diplomat, U.S. Ambassador to Libya (d. 2012)
 April 19
 Gustavo Petro, President of Colombia, 2022 - 2026
 April 20 – Miguel Díaz-Canel, Cuban politician, First Secretary of the Communist Party of Cuba and 17th President of Cuba
 April 23
 Valerie Bertinelli, American actress and presenter (born April 23, 1960)
 Steve Clark, English guitarist (Def Leppard) (d. 1991)
 David Gedge, English musician (The Wedding Present and Cinerama)
 Léo Jaime, Brazilian writer, actor and musician (João Penca e Seus Miquinhos Amestrados )
 Claude Julien, Canadian ice hockey coach
 April 24 – Masami Kikuchi, Japanese voice actor
 April 25 – Michael Lohan, American television personality; father of Lindsay Lohan
 April 28
 Elena Kagan, Associate Justice of the Supreme Court of the United States
 Ian Rankin, Scottish crime novelist
 April 29 – Steve Blum, American voice actor

May

 May 2
 Stephen Daldry, English film director
 Gjorge Ivanov, President of Macedonia
 May 4 – Werner Faymann, Chancellor of Austria
 May 8
 Franco Baresi, Italian footballer
 Sergey Belyayev, Kazakhstani shooter (d. 2020)
 Patrick McKenna, Canadian actor and comedian
 May 10 
 Bono, Irish rock singer (U2)
 Merlene Ottey, Jamaican-Slovenian former track and field sprinter
 May 14 – Ronan Tynan, Irish tenor
 May 15 – Julian Jarrold, English film and television director and producer
 May 16
 Landon Deireragea, Nauruan politician
 Lovebug Starski, American rapper and disc jockey (d. 2018)
 May 17 – John Payne, English actor and voice actor
 May 18
 Jari Kurri, Finnish hockey player
 Yannick Noah, French tennis player
 May 19 – Yazz, British pop singer
 May 20
 John Billingsley, American actor
 Tony Goldwyn, American actor, voice actor, and film director
 May 21
 Jeffrey Dahmer, American serial killer (d. 1994)
 Mark Ridgway, Australian cricketer
 Vladimir Salnikov, Russian swimmer
 May 21 – Mohanlal, Indian actor
 May 22 
 Amir Ishemgulov, Russian biologist and politician (d. 2020)
 Hideaki Anno, Japanese director
 May 23 – Linden Ashby, American actor
 May 24
 Greg Conescu, Australian rugby league player
 Guy Fletcher, British keyboardist (Dire Straits)
 Doug Jones, American actor
 Kristin Scott Thomas, English actress
 May 25 – Amy Klobuchar, American politician
 May 26 – Rob Murphy, American baseball player
 May 27
 Alexander Bashlachev, Soviet poet and rock musician (d. 1988)
 D. Kupendra Reddy, Indian politician
 May 29
 Thomas Baumer, Swiss economist, interculturalist and personality assessor
 Neil Crone, Canadian actor
 May 30 
 Micah Barnes, Canadian pop singer-songwriter
 Carmen Velasquez, American justice, New York City Civil Court
 May 31 –Chris Elliott, American actor and comedian

June

 June 2
 P. Balasubramaniam, Malaysian police officer (d. 2013)
 Tony Hadley, British pop musician and was lead singer of Spandau Ballet
 Kyle Petty, American NASCAR driver and sports commentator
 Maria Lourdes Sereno, Filipina jurist, 24th Chief Justice of the Supreme Court of the Philippines
 June 3 – Catherine Davani, first female Papua New Guinean judge (d. 2016)
 June 5 – Seiichi Endo, Japanese criminal (d. 2018)
 June 6 – Steve Vai, American guitarist
 June 8
 Gary Trousdale, American animator and film director
 Mick Hucknall, English rock singer and songwriter (Simply Red)
 June 11 – Mehmet Oz, Turkish-American cardiothoracic surgeon and television personality
 June 12 – Corynne Charby, French model, actress and singer
 June 15 – Michèle Laroque, French actress
 June 17 
 Thomas Haden Church, American actor and film director
 Adrián Campos, Spanish Formula One driver (d. 2021)
 June 20 – Anatoly Donika, Russian former professional ice hockey player
 June 21 – Karl Erjavec, Slovenian lawyer and politician
 June 22 – Erin Brockovich, American environmental activist
 June 23 – Per Morberg, Swedish actor, chef and news presenter
 June 26 – Mauro Carlesse, Brazilian politician, Governor of Tocantins
 June 27 – Michael Mayer, American theatre director, film director, television director and playwright
 June 28 – John Elway, American football player
 June 29 – Ivans Ribakovs, Latvian politician
 June 30
 Anna Šišková, Slovak actress
 Tony Bellotto, Brazilian guitarist and writer
 Diego Trujillo, Colombian actor
 Vincent Klyn, New Zealand-born actor and surfer

July

 July 1
 Kōji Ishii, Japanese voice actor
 Mikael Håfström, Swedish film director and screenwriter
 July 3
 Vince Clarke, British musician and composer (Depeche Mode, Erasure)
 Perrine Pelen, French alpine skier
 Håkan Loob, Swedish ice hockey player
 July 4 – Roland Ratzenberger, Austrian Formula One driver (d. 1994)
 July 5
 Brad Loree, Canadian actor and stuntman
 Hugo Rubio, Chilean football player
 July 6
 Ferenc Juhász, Minister of Defence for Hungary
 Lyudmyla Denisova, Ukrainian politician
 July 7 – Kevin A. Ford, American astronaut
 July 8 
 Thilo Martinho, German composer and singer-songwriter
 Eleanor Scott, British archaeologist and politician
 July 9 
 Yūko Asano, Japanese actress and singer
 Charles Gavin, Brazilian drummer and producer
 Wanda Vázquez Garced, Puerto Rican politician, Governor
 Michael Feichtenbeiner, German football coach
 July 10 
Jeff Bergman, American voice actor, comedian and impressionist
Ariel Castro, Puerto Rican-American convicted kidnapper, rapist and former bus driver (d. 2013)
July 11 – Jafar Panahi, Iranian filmmaker
 July 12 – Sully Díaz, Puerto Rican actress and singer
 July 13 
 Ian Hislop, British journalist and broadcaster
 Frane Perišin, Croatian actor
 July 14
 Kyle Gass, American music singer-songwriter-guitarist/actor
 Jane Lynch, American actress, comedian and author
 Taung Galay Sayadaw, Burmese buddhist monk
 Angélique Kidjo, Beninese singer-songwriter and activist
 July 15
 Dennis Storhøi, Norwegian actor
 Martyn Joseph, Welsh singer-songwriter
 Sergio Kato, Brazilian actor, television host, comedian and martial artist
 July 16
 Cedric Foo, Singaporean politician and corporate executive
 Jacqueline Gold, British businesswoman (d. 2023)
 PJ Powers, South African musician
 July 17
 Robin Shou, Hong Kong martial artist and actor
 Mark Burnett, British television and film producer
 Jan Wouters, Dutch football player and manager
 July 19 – Atom Egoyan, Armenian-Canadian film maker
 July 20 – Jonathon Morris, English actor and television presenter
 July 21
 Ezequiel Viñao, Argentine-born composer
 Fritz Walter, German footballer
July 22 - John Leguizamo, Colombian-American actor, comedian and producer
 July 27 – Uddhav Thackeray, Indian Politician
 July 28
 Jonathan Gold, American food critic (d. 2018)
 Harald Lesch, German physicist, astronomer, natural philosopher, author, television presenter, professor of physics
 July 30 – Richard Linklater, American director
 July 31 – Dale Hunter, Canadian ice hockey player and coach

August

 August 1
 Chuck D, American rapper (Public Enemy)
 Professor Griff, American rapper (Public Enemy)
 August 4
 Dean Malenko, American professional wrestler
 José Luis Rodríguez Zapatero, Prime Minister of Spain
 August 7
 Rosana Pastor, Spanish actress
 David Duchovny, American actor
 August 10
 Antonio Banderas, Spanish actor and film director
 Kenny Perry, American golfer
 August 12 – Laurent Fignon, French road bicycle racer (d. 2010)
 August 13
 Koji Kondo, Japanese composer
 Phil Taylor, English darts player
 August 14 – Sarah Brightman, English soprano singer and actress
 August 15 – Judy Holt, British television actress
 August 16
 Franz Welser-Möst, Austrian conductor
 Timothy Hutton, American actor
 August 17 – Sean Penn, American actor and film director
 August 18 – Stuart Matthewman, English songwriter
 August 19 – Morten Andersen, American football player
 August 20 – Elizabeth Alda, American actress
 August 22 – Regina Taylor, American actress
 August 23 – Chris Potter, Canadian actor and musician
 August 24 – Cal Ripken Jr., American baseball player
 August 26
 Branford Marsalis, American musician
 Ola Ray, American actress and model
 August 28 – Jodi Carlisle, American actress
 August 29 – Viire Valdma, Estonian actress

September

 September 1 – Joseph Williams, American singer and film score composer
 September 2 – John S. Hall, American poet and spoken-word artist
 September 4
 Kim Thayil, American rock guitarist (Soundgarden)
 Damon Wayans, African-American actor and comedian
 September 5 – Karita Mattila, Finnish soprano
 September 7
 Phillip Rhee, American actor, producer and writer
 Dušan Pašek, Slovak ice hockey player (d. 1998)
 September 9
 Mario Batali, American chef and host
 Hugh Grant, English actor and activist
 Johnson Righeira, Italian singer-songwriter, musician, record producer and actor
 Bob Stoops, American football coach
 September 10
Margaret Ferrier, Scottish politician
Colin Firth, English actor
 September 11 – Annie Gosfield, American composer
 September 12
 Robert John Burke, American actor
 Evan Jenkins, American politician
 Barham Salih, Iraqi Kurdish politician, 8th President of Iraq
 September 13 – Kevin Carter, South African photojournalist (d. 1994)
 September 14
 Melissa Leo, American actress
 Callum Keith Rennie, Canadian actor
 September 15 – Jimmy Bridges, American actor
 September 18 – Elena Valenciano, Spanish politician
 September 16
 John Franco, American baseball player
 Yianna Katsoulos, French singer
 September 17
 Alan Krueger, American economist (d. 2019)
 Damon Hill, British 1996 Formula 1 world champion
 Kevin Clash, American actor and puppeteer
 September 19 – Yolanda Saldívar, American murderer of tejano singer Selena
 September 21 – David James Elliott, Canadian-American actor
 September 22 – Scott Baio, American actor
 September 25 – Eduardo Yáñez, Mexican film and television actor

October

 October 4 – Ana Patricia Botín, Spanish banker
 October 5 
 Careca, Brazilian footballer
 Hitomi Kuroki, Japanese actress
 October 6 – Toru Takahashi, Japanese race car driver (d. 1983)
 October 8 – Rano Karno, Indonesian actor and politician
 October 9 – Marin Mazzie, American actress and singer (d. 2018)
 October 13 – Joey Belladonna, American heavy metal singer (Anthrax)
 October 17 – Bernie Nolan, Irish actress and singer (The Nolans) (d. 2013)
 October 18
 Alex Ferrer, Cuban-American television personality, lawyer and judge 
 Jean-Claude Van Damme, Belgian actor and martial artist
 Erin Moran, American actress (d. 2017)
 October 24
 BD Wong, American actor
 Jaime Garzón, Colombian journalist and comedian (d. 1999)
 October 26 – Jouke de Vries, Dutch–Frisian politician
 October 29 – Dieter Nuhr, German comedian
 October 30 – Diego Maradona, Argentine footballer (d. 2020)
 October 31 
Luis Fortuño, Puerto Rican politician, Governor of Puerto Rico (2009–2013)
Reza Pahlavi, Crown Prince of Iran

November

 November 1 – Tim Cook, American businessman and current CEO of Apple, Inc
 November 3 – Karch Kiraly, American volleyball player
 November 4 – Siniša Glavašević, Croatian reporter (d. 1991)
 November 5 – Tilda Swinton, British actress
 November 8
 Michael Nyqvist, Swedish actor (d. 2017)
 Megan Cavanagh, American actress and voice actress
 November 9
 Andreas Brehme, German football player and manager
 Joëlle Ursull, Guadeloupean singer
 November 10 – Neil Gaiman, English author
 November 11 – Stanley Tucci, American actor and film director
 November 12 – Maurane, Belgian singer and actress (d. 2018)
 November 15 – Susanne Lothar, German actress (d. 2012)
 November 17 
Jonathan Ross, English television presenter
RuPaul, American drag queen and entertainer
 November 18 
 Elizabeth Perkins, American actress
 Kim Wilde, English pop singer, DJ and television presenter.
 November 19
 Miss Elizabeth, American professional wrestling valet (d. 2003)
 Hiroshi Naka, Japanese voice actor
 November 20 – Marc Labrèche, Canadian actor and television host
 November 24 – Amanda Wyss, American actress
 November 25
 Robert Dunlop, Northern Irish motorcycle racer (d. 2008)
 Amy Grant, American Christian and pop musician
 John F. Kennedy Jr., American lawyer, journalist and son of 35th President John F. Kennedy (d. 1999)
 November 26
 Greg Berg, American actor and voice actor
 Harold Reynolds, American baseball player and broadcaster
 November 27
 Eike Immel, German football player and manager
 Tim Pawlenty, American politician
 Yulia Tymoshenko, Prime Minister of Ukraine in 2005 and 2007-2010
November 29 – Cathy Moriarty, American actress
 November 30
 Rich Fields, American television personality
 Gary Lineker, English footballer and sports presenter

December

 December 1 – Carol Alt, American model and actress
 December 2 – Silk Smitha, Indian actress (d.1996)
 December 3
 Daryl Hannah, American actress and environmental activist
 Julianne Moore, American actress and children's author
 December 4 – Glynis Nunn, Australian athlete
 December 5
 Brian Bromberg, American jazz bassist and composer
 Jack Russell, American rock singer (Great White)
 December 8 – Lim Guan Eng, Malaysian politician and former Chief Minister of Penang, Malaysia
 December 9 – Steve Doll, American professional wrestler (d. 2009)
 December 10 – Sir Kenneth Branagh, Northern Irish actor and director
 December 12 – Volker Beck, German politician
 December 17 – Tarako, Japanese voice actress
 December 18 – Kazuhide Uekusa, Japanese economist
 December 20 – Kim Ki-duk, South Korean director and screenwriter (d. 2020)
 December 22 – Jean-Michel Basquiat, American musician and graffiti painter (d. 1988)
 December 26 – Temuera Morrison, New Zealand actor
 December 27 – Maryam d'Abo, British actress
 December 28
 Ray Bourque, Canadian ice hockey player
 John Fitzgerald, Australian tennis player
 December 29 – Dave Pelzer, American author

Deaths

January

 January 1 
 Gianni Franciolini, Italian director and screenwriter (b. 1910)
 Margaret Sullavan, American actress (b. 1909)
 January 3 – Victor Sjöström, Swedish actor (b. 1879)
 January 4
 Albert Camus, French writer, Nobel Prize winner (b. 1913)
 Dudley Nichols, American screenwriter (b. 1895)
 January 5 – Donald Knight, English cricketer (b. 1894)
 January 7 – Dorothea Chambers, English tennis champion (b. 1878)
 January 8 – Ion Codreanu, Romanian general (b. 1891)
 January 9 – Elsie J. Oxenham, English children's novelist (b. 1880)
 January 10 – Arthur S. Carpender, American admiral (b. 1884)
 January 11 – Isabel Emslie Hutton, Scottish nurse in Serbia during World War I and psychiatrist (b. 1887)
 January 12 – Nevil Shute, English-born novelist (b. 1899)
 January 19 – Dadasaheb Torne, Indian filmmaker (b. 1890)
 January 24
 Matt Moore, Irish-American actor (b. 1888)
 Edwin Fischer, Swiss pianist and conductor (b. 1886)
 January 25
 Diana Barrymore, American stage and film actress (b. 1921)
 Rutland Boughton, English composer (b. 1878)
 Beno Gutenberg, German-American seismologist (b. 1889)
 January 27 – Osvaldo Aranha, Brazilian politician (b. 1894)
 January 28 – Zora Neale Hurston, American folklorist, anthropologist and author (b. 1891)
 January 30 – J. C. Kumarappa, Indian economist (b. 1892)

February

 February 2 – Swami Bharati Krishna Tirtha, Hindu teacher (b. 1884)
 February 3 – Fred Buscaglione, Italian singer and actor (b. 1921)
 February 6 – Jesse Belvin, American urban singer (b. 1932)
 February 7 – Igor Kurchatov, Soviet physicist (b. 1903)
 February 8
 J. L. Austin, British philosopher (b. 1911)
 Sir Giles Gilbert Scott, British architect (b. 1880)
 February 9 
 Adolph Coors III, American brewer and kidnap victim (b. 1916)
 Ernst von Dohnányi, Hungarian conductor (b. 1877)
 February 10 – Aloysius Stepinac, Yugoslav Roman Catholic prelate (b. 1898)
 February 12 – Jean-Michel Atlan, French painter (b. 1913)
 February 14 – Masatomi Kimura, Japanese admiral (b. 1891)
 February 20
 Leonard Woolley, English archaeologist (b. 1880)
 Adone Zoli, Italian politician, 35th Prime Minister of Italy (b. 1887)
 February 29
 Jacques Becker, French director (b. 1906)
 Edwina Mountbatten, Countess Mountbatten of Burma (b. 1901), last Vicereine of India
 Melvin Purvis, American lawman and FBI agent (b. 1903)
 Walter Yust, American encyclopedia editor (b. 1894)

March
 March 2 – Stanisław Taczak, Polish general (b. 1874)
 March 4 – Leonard Warren, American opera singer (b. 1911)
 March 9 – Jack Beattie, Irish politician (b. 1886)
 March 11
 Roy Chapman Andrews, American explorer, adventurer and naturalist (b. 1884)
 Takuma Kajiwara, Japanese-born American photographer (b.1876)
 March 13
 Louis Wagner, French Grand Prix racer, aviator (b. 1882)
 Yosef Zvi HaLevy, Israeli rabbi and judge (b. 1874)
 March 14 – Oliver Kirk, American Olympic boxer (b. 1884)
 March 22 – José Antonio Aguirre, Spanish politician (b. 1904)
 March 23 – Franklin P. Adams, American journalist (b. 1881)
 March 26 – Ian Keith, American actor (b. 1899)
 March 27
 Mario Talavera, Mexican songwriter (b. 1885)
 Gregorio Marañón, Spanish physician, scientist, historian and philosopher. (b. 1887)

April

 April 1
 Abdul Rahman of Negeri Sembilan, King of Malaysia (b. 1895)
 Madeleine Rolland, French translator and peace activist (b. 1872)
 April 3 – Norodom Suramarit, King of Cambodia (b. 1896)
 April 5
 Cuthbert Burnup, English sportsman (b. 1875)
 Peter Llewelyn Davies, namesake for Peter Pan (b. 1897)
 Alma Kruger, American actress (b. 1868)
 April 10 – Arthur Benjamin, Australian composer (b. 1893)
 April 17 – Eddie Cochran, American rock singer (b. 1938)
 April 19 – Beardsley Ruml, American economist and tax plan author (b. 1894)
 April 24
 Hope Emerson, American actress, performer, and strongwoman (b. 1897)
 Max von Laue, German physicist, Nobel Prize laureate (b. 1879)
 George Relph, English actor (b. 1888)
 April 25
 Amānullāh Khān, Emir and King of Afghanistan (b. 1892)
 Turan Emeksiz, Turkish student killed during the demonstrations (b. 1940)
 April 26 – Gustaf Lindblom, Swedish Olympic athlete (b. 1891)
 April 28 – Carlos Ibáñez del Campo, Chilean army officer and political figure, 20th President of Chile (b. 1877)

May

 May 2 – Caryl Chessman, American criminal (b. 1921)
 May 3 – Masa Niemi, Finnish actor (b. 1914)
 May 8
 Hersch Lauterpacht, British international lawyer (b. 1897)
 J. H. C. Whitehead, British mathematician (b. 1904)
 May 11 – John D. Rockefeller Jr., American philanthropist (b. 1874)
 May 12 – Prince Aly Khan, Pakistani United Nations ambassador (b. 1911)
 May 14 – Lucrezia Bori, Spanish opera singer (b. 1887)
 May 22 – İbrahim Çallı, Turkish painter (b. 1882)
 May 23
 Georges Claude, French inventor (b. 1870)
 The Great Gama, Punjabi wrestler (b. 1878)
 May 24 – Avraham Arnon, Israeli educator and a recipient of the Israel Prize (b. 1887)
 May 25 – Rafael Gómez Ortega, Spanish bullfighter (b. 1882)
 May 27
 George Zucco, English-born character actor (b. 1886)
 James Montgomery Flagg, American artist, comics artist and illustrator (b. 1877)
 May 30 – Boris Pasternak, Russian writer, Nobel Prize laureate (declined)  (b. 1890)
 May 31 – Walther Funk, German Nazi politician (b. 1890)

June

 June 4
 Józef Haller de Hallenburg, Polish general (b. 1873)
 Lucien Littlefield, American actor (b. 1895)
 June 13 – Ken McArthur, South African athlete (b. 1881)
 June 14 – Ana Pauker, Romanian communist politician (b. 1893)
 June 17 – Arthur Rosson, English film director (b. 1886)
 June 18 – Shalva Aleksi-Meskhishvili, Georgian politician (b. 1884)
 June 19 – Chris Bristow, English race car driver (b. 1937)
 June 20 – William E. Fairbairn, English soldier, police officer and hand-to-hand combat expert (b. 1885)
 June 25
 Walter Baade, German astronomer (b. 1893)
 Otto Ender, Austrian political figure, 8th Chancellor of Austria (b. 1875)
 June 27 – Lottie Dod, English tennis player; Wimbledon women's champion, 1887–88, 1891–93 (b. 1871)
 June 28 
 Móric Esterházy, Hungarian aristocrat and politician, 18th Prime Minister of Hungary (b. 1881)
 Jaume Vicens i Vives, Spanish historian (b. 1910)

July

 July 2 – Margherita Bagni, Italian actress (b. 1902)
 July 6 
 Aneurin Bevan, British politician (b. 1897)
 Hans Wilsdorf, German-Swiss watchmaker, founder of Rolex (b. 1881)
 July 7 – Francis Browne, Irish Jesuit priest, famous for his last photos of the RMS Titanic (b. 1880)
 July 12 
 Buddy Adler, American film producer (b. 1909)
 Francis Xavier Gsell, Australian Roman Catholic bishop and missionary (b. 1872)
 July 14 – Maurice de Broglie, French physicist (b. 1875)
 July 15
 Anton Giulio Bragaglia, Italian cinematographer (b. 1890)
 Set Persson, Swedish politician (b. 1897)
 Lawrence Tibbett, American opera singer and actor (b. 1896)
 July 16
 Albert Kesselring, German field marshal (b. 1885)
 John P. Marquand, American novelist (b. 1893)
 Manuel Gamio, Mexican anthropologist and archaeologist (b. 1883)
 July 17 
 Pavel Peter Gojdič, Czechoslovak Roman Catholic monk and blessed (b. 1888)
 Maud Menten, Canadian biochemist (b. 1879)
 July 22 – Yan Xishan, Chinese warlord and politician (b. 1883)
 July 24 – Hans Albers, German actor and singer (b. 1891)
 July 26 – Cedric Gibbons, Irish-American art director (b. 1893)
 July 27 – Georgi Kyoseivanov, 27th Prime Minister of Bulgaria (b. 1884)
 July 28 – Enrique Amorim, Uruguayan novelist (b. 1900)
 July 29 – Hasan Saka, 7th Prime Minister of Turkey (b. 1885)

August

 August 2 – Francesca French, British Protestant missionary (b. 1871)
 August 5 – Arthur Meighen, 9th Prime Minister of Canada (b. 1874)
 August 7
 Walden L. Ainsworth, American admiral (b. 1886)
 Luis Ángel Firpo, Argentine boxer (b. 1894)
 August 9 – Richard Cramer, American actor (b. 1889)
 August 10
 Frank Lloyd, British-born American film director (b. 1886)
 Oswald Veblen, American mathematician, geometer and topologist (b. 1880)
 August 14 – Fred Clarke, American baseball player (Pittsburgh Pirates) and a member of the MLB Hall of Fame (b. 1872)
 August 17 – Charles W. Ryder, American general (b. 1892)
 August 18 – Carlo Emilio Bonferroni, Italian mathematician (b. 1892)
 August 22
 Eduard Pütsep, Estonian wrestler (b. 1898)
 Johannes Sikkar, Estonian politician (b. 1897)
 August 23
 Jersey Flegg, English-Australian rugby league player and chairman (b. 1878)
 Oscar Hammerstein II, American librettist (b. 1895)
 August 27 – Stanley Clifford Weyman, American impostor (b. 1890)
 August 28 – Sir Charles Forbes, British admiral (b. 1880)
 August 29
 Hazza' al-Majali, Prime Minister of Jordan (b. 1917)
 Vicki Baum, Austrian writer (b. 1888)
 David Diop, French West African poet (b. 1927)

September

 September 1 – Hisamuddin of Selangor, King of Malaysia (b. 1898)
 September 4 – Alfred E. Green, American film director (b. 1889)
 September 8
 Feroze Gandhi, Indian politician (b. 1912)
 Oscar Pettiford, American jazz string player (b. 1922)
 September 9 – Jussi Björling, Swedish tenor (b. 1911)
 September 11 – Edwin Justus Mayer, American screenwriter (b. 1896)
 September 13 – Leó Weiner, Hungarian composer (b. 1885)
 September 20 
 Ida Rubinstein, Russian ballet dancer (b. 1883)
 Ernest William Goodpasture, American pathologist and physician (b. 1886)
 September 22 – Melanie Klein, Austrian-British psychoanalyst (b. 1882)
 September 23 – Kathlyn Williams, American stage and silent film actress (b. 1879)
 September 24 – Mátyás Seiber, Hungarian composer (b. 1905)
 September 25 – Emily Post, American etiquette expert (b. 1873)
 September 27 – Sylvia Pankhurst, English suffragette (b. 1882)
 September 30 – St John Philby, Ceylonese-born British Arabist (b. 1885)

October

 October 5 – Alfred L. Kroeber, American anthropologist (b. 1876)
 October 11 – Richard Cromwell, American film actor (b. 1910)
 October 12 – Inejiro Asanuma, Japanese politician (assassinated) (b. 1898)
 October 14 – Abram Ioffe, Soviet physicist (b. 1903)
 October 15
 Henny Porten, German actress and producer (b. 1890)
 Clara Kimball Young, American actress (b. 1890)
 October 19 – Hjalmar Dahl, Finnish journalist, translator and writer (b. 1891)
 October 21 
 Katharine Stewart-Murray, Duchess of Atholl, Scottish aristocrat and politician (b. 1874)
 Ma Hongbin, Chinese warlord (b. 1884)
 October 24
 Mitrofan Nedelin, Soviet Chief Marshal of the Artillery, chief of the Strategic Missile Force, Hero of the Soviet Union (b. 1902)
 Yevgeny Ostashev, Soviet head of the 1st control polygon NIIP-5 (Baikonur), Lenin prize winner (b. 1924)
 October 25 – Harry Ferguson, Irish engineer and inventor (b. 1884)
 October 31 – H. L. Davis, American fiction writer and poet (b. 1894)

November

 November 2
Dimitri Mitropoulos, Greek conductor, pianist and composer (b. 1896)
 Julio Nakpil, Filipino composer and general (b. 1867)
 Otoya Yamaguchi, Japanese ultranationalist assassin (b. 1943)
 November 3
 Bobby Wallace, American baseball player (St. Louis Browns) and a member of the MLB Hall of Fame (b. 1873)
 Sir Harold Spencer Jones, English astronomer (b. 1890)
 November 5
 Ward Bond, American actor (b. 1903)
 August Gailit, Estonian writer (b. 1891)
 Johnny Horton, American country singer (b. 1925)
 Mack Sennett, Canadian film producer and director (b. 1880)
 November 6 
Sir John Bonython, Australian businessman and politician (b. 1875)
 Erich Raeder, German World War II naval leader (b. 1876)
 November 7 – A. P. Carter, American singer and songwriter (b. 1891)
 November 11 – Monte Attell, American boxer (b. 1885)
 November 12 – Lord Buckley, American monologist (b. 1906)
 November 16
 Paul Faure, French Socialist politician (b. 1878)
 Clark Gable, American actor (b. 1901)
 November 19 – Phyllis Haver, American actress (b. 1899)
 November 23 – Allen Hobbs, 32nd Governor of American Samoa (b. 1889)
 November 24 – Grand Duchess Olga Alexandrovna of Russia, sister of Tsar Nicholas II (b. 1882)
 November 25 – Patria (b. 1924), Minerva (b. 1926), and Maria Teresa Mirabal (b. 1935), three Dominican revolutionaries (and their driver, Rufino de la Cruz)
 November 26 – Helen Hellwig, American tennis player (b. 1874)
 November 28
 Richard Wright, American novelist (b. 1908)
 Dirk Jan de Geer, Dutch nobleman, lawyer and politician, 26th Prime Minister of the Netherlands (b. 1870)
 November 29 – Sir Andrew Russell, New Zealand Army general (b. 1868)

December

 December 5 – Hashim al-Atassi, Syrian statesman, 2nd Prime Minister of Syria and 4th President of Syria (b. 1875)
 December 7 
 Virginia Balestrieri, Italian actress (b. 1888)
 Ioannis Demestichas, Greek admiral (b. 1882)
 December 12 – Christopher Hornsrud, 11th Prime Minister of Norway (b. 1859)
 December 13
 John Charles Thomas, American opera singer (b. 1891)
 Nancy Elizabeth Prophet, African-American artist known for her sculpture (b. 1890)
 December 14 – Gregory Ratoff, Russian actor and director
 December 22 – Sir Ninian Comper, British architect (b. 1864)
 December 25 – Alberto Maria de Agostini, Italian missionary (b. 1883)
 December 26
 Giuseppe Mario Bellanca, Italian-American aircraft designer and company founder (b. 1886)
 Watsuji Tetsuro, Japanese philosopher (b. 1889)

Date unknown
 Signe Bergman, Swedish suffragist (b. 1869)

Nobel Prizes

 Physics – Donald Arthur Glaser
 Chemistry – Willard Libby
 Physiology or Medicine – Sir Frank Macfarlane Burnet, Peter Medawar
 Literature – Saint-John Perse
 Peace – Albert Lutuli

References

 
Leap years in the Gregorian calendar